Foghat is the debut studio album by American-based English rock band  Foghat. The first of their two self-titled albums, it was released in 1972 on Bearsville Records.

Track listing
"I Just Want to Make Love to You" (Willie Dixon) – 4:21
"Trouble, Trouble" (Dave Peverett) – 3:20
"Leavin' Again (Again!)" (Peverett, Tony Stevens) – 3:36
"Fool's Hall of Fame" (Peverett) – 2:58
"Sarah Lee" (Peverett, Rod Price) – 4:36
"Highway (Killing Me)" (Peverett, Price) – 3:51
"Maybelline" (sic) (Chuck Berry) – 3:33
"A Hole to Hide In" (Peverett, Price, Roger Earl) – 4:06
"Gotta Get to Know You" (Deadric Malone, Andre Williams) – 7:44

Personnel
Foghat
Dave Peverett – vocals, rhythm guitar
Rod Price – lead and slide guitar, dobro
Tony Stevens – bass guitar, harmony vocals
Roger Earl – drums, percussion

Additional musicians
Colin Earl – piano
Dave Edmunds – additional guitars
Kipps – unknown
Todd Rundgren – piano on "Trouble Trouble"
John Williams – additional bass
Andy Fairweather Low – backing vocals

Production
Dave Edmunds – production
Ralph Downs and Kingsley Ward – engineering
Dave Edmunds; Nick Jameson (tracks 5 and 7) – mixing

Charts

Certifications

References

External links
Official Foghat website

1972 debut albums
Foghat albums
Albums produced by Dave Edmunds
Bearsville Records albums